Xenyllogastrura is a genus of springtails in the family Hypogastruridae. There are about eight described species in Xenyllogastrura.

Species
These eight species belong to the genus Xenyllogastrura:
 Xenyllogastrura affinis (Steiner, 1955) i c g
 Xenyllogastrura afurcata Deharveng & Gers, 1979 i c g
 Xenyllogastrura arenaria Fjellberg, 1992 i c g
 Xenyllogastrura octoculata (Steiner, 1955) i c g
 Xenyllogastrura pruvoti Denis, 1932 i c g
 Xenyllogastrura reducta Fjellberg, 1992 i c g
 Xenyllogastrura steineri Jordana & Arbea, 1992 i c g
 Xenyllogastrura venezueliensis Thibaud & Diaz, 1998 i c g
Data sources: i = ITIS, c = Catalogue of Life, g = GBIF, b = Bugguide.net

References

Further reading

 
 
 

Collembola
Springtail genera